Ancylosis sabulosella is a species of snout moth in the genus Ancylosis. It was described by Staudinger, in 1879. It is found in Russia.

The wingspan is about 17 mm.

References

Moths described in 1879
sabulosella
Moths of Europe